Chikkajajur is a village in Holalkere taluk in Chitradurga district of Karnataka, India, India. It belongs to Bangalore Division . It is located 34 KM towards west from District head quarters Chitradurga. 10 KM from Holalkere. 237 KM from State capital Bangalore.

Demographics
As of 2001 India census, Chikkajajur had a population of 5986 with 2971 males and 3015 females. It has a railway junction that connects to the major cities in Karnataka like Bangalore, Hubli, Davanagere and many more. This village has some historical place near by Baramannanayakana durga. The king Baramanna was the founder of this village, these villages are in the Chitradurga district.

See also
 Chitradurga
 Districts of Karnataka

References

External links
 http://Chitradurga.nic.in/

Villages in Chitradurga district